Ahwa is the headquarters of Dang District in the state of Gujarat, in India. It is situated about 1800 feet (549 m) above the sea level. The whole district, inhabited by the tribal people, is a hilly area covered with thick forest. Venomous snakes from here are sent to the Haffkine Institute, Bombay, for preparing injections.

Ahwa was selected as the headquarter of the Dang by James Outram before 1857.

See also 
 Ahwa Forest

References 

Cities and towns in Dang district, India